Michael Woodger (born 28 March 1923) is a pioneering English computer scientist. He was influential in the development of the early Pilot ACE computer, working with Alan Turing, and later the design and documentation of programming languages such as ALGOL 60 and Ada. He was based at the National Physical Laboratory (NPL) located in Teddington, London, for most of his career.

Mike Woodger was the eldest of four children. His father was Joseph Henry Woodger (1894–1981), a professor of biology at the University of London. He graduated from University College London in 1943 and worked at the Ministry of Supply on military applications for the rest of World War II. In May 1946, he then joined the new Mathematics Division at the National Physical Laboratory located in west London. At NPL, he worked with Alan Turing on the ACE computer design, leading eventually to the Pilot ACE computer after Turing had left NPL, first operational in 1950. He later worked on programming language design, especially ALGOL 60 and Ada.

References

1923 births
Living people
Alumni of University College London
British people of World War II
Computer designers
English computer scientists
History of computing in the United Kingdom
People from Epsom
Programming language designers